The 1951 Paris–Nice was the ninth edition of the Paris–Nice cycle race and was held from 13 March to 17 March 1951. The race started in Paris and finished in Nice. The race was won by Roger Decock.

General classification

References

1951
1951 in road cycling
1951 in French sport
March 1951 sports events in Europe